The Douglas DC-1 was the first model of the famous American DC (Douglas Commercial) commercial transport aircraft series. Although only one example of the DC-1 was produced, the design was the basis for the DC-2 and DC-3, the latter of which being one of the most successful aircraft in the history of aviation.

Design and development
Development of the DC-1 can be traced back to the 1931 crash of a TWA airliner, a Fokker F-10 trimotor in which a wing failed, probably because water had seeped between the layers of the wood laminate and dissolved the glue holding the layers together. Following the accident, the Aeronautics Branch of the U.S. Department of Commerce placed stringent restrictions on the use of wooden wings on passenger airliners. Boeing developed an answer, the 247, a twin-engined all-metal monoplane with a retractable undercarriage, but their production capacity was reserved to meet the needs of  United Airlines, part of United Aircraft and Transport Corporation which also owned Boeing. TWA needed a similar aircraft to respond to competition from the Boeing 247 and they asked five manufacturers to bid for construction of a three-engined, 12-seat aircraft of all-metal construction, capable of flying 1,080 mi (1,740 km) at 150 mph (242 km/h).  The most demanding part of the specification was that the airliner would have to be capable of safely taking off from any airport on TWA's main routes (and in particular Albuquerque, at high altitude and with severe summer temperatures) with one engine non-functioning.

Donald Douglas was initially reluctant to participate in the invitation from TWA. He doubted that there would be a market for 100 aircraft, the number of sales necessary to cover development costs. Nevertheless, he submitted a design consisting of an all-metal, low-wing, twin-engined aircraft seating 12 passengers, a crew of two and a flight attendant. The aircraft exceeded the specifications of TWA even with only two engines, principally through the use of controllable pitch propellers. It was insulated against noise, heated, and fully capable of both flying and performing a controlled takeoff or landing on one engine.

Don Douglas stated in a 1935 article on the DC-2 that the first DC-1 cost $325,000 to design and build.

Operational history

Only one aircraft was produced. The prototype made its maiden flight on July 1, 1933, flown by Carl Cover. It was given the model name DC-1, or Douglas Commercial Model 1. During a half-year of testing, it performed more than 200 test flights and demonstrated its superiority over the most-used airliners at that time, the Ford Trimotor and Fokker Trimotor. It was flown across the United States on February 19, 1934, making the journey in the record time of 13 hours 5 minutes.

TWA accepted the aircraft on 15 September 1933 with a few modifications (mainly increasing seating to 14 passengers and adding more powerful engines) and subsequently ordered 20 examples of the developed production model which was named the Douglas DC-2.

The DC-1 was sold to Lord Forbes in the United Kingdom in May 1938, who operated it for a few months before selling it in France in October 1938. It was then sold to Líneas Aéreas Postales Españolas (L.A.P.E.) in Spain in November 1938 and was also used by the Spanish Republican Air Force as a transport aircraft. Later operated by Iberia Airlines from July 1939 with the name Negron, it force-landed at Málaga, Spain, on October 4, 1940 and was damaged beyond repair.

Specifications (DC-1)

See also

References

Notes

Bibliography
 Francillon, René J. McDonnell Douglas Aircraft since 1920. London: Putnam, 1979. .
 Freidman, Herbert M. and Ada Kera Friedman. "The Legacy of the Rockne Crash". Aeroplane,  Vol. 29, No. 5, Issue 337, May 2001, pp. 34–40. London: IPC. ISSN 0143-7240. 
 Gradidge, Jennifer M., ed. DC-1, DC-2, DC-3: The First Seventy Years. Tonbridge, Kent, UK: Air-Britain (Historians), Two volumes, 2006. .
 O'Leary, Michael. "Database: Douglas DC-1 & DC-2". Aeroplane, Vol. 35, No. 2, Issue 406, February 2007, pp. 70–89. London: IPC. ISSN 0143-7240. 
 Pearcy, Arthur. "Douglas Commercial Two". Air Enthusiast, Nineteen, August–November 1982, pp. 60–77. Bromley, UK: Fine Scroll. ISSN 0143-5450. 

Smith, Richard K. (1998). Seventy-Five Years of Inflight Refueling: Highlights 1923–1998 Air Force History and Museums, Air University, Maxwell AFB

External links

  A contemporary, somewhat technical article on the Douglas DC-1.
 Douglas DC-1, 2, and 3
 Douglas DC-1, 
The Beginning of an Era: The DC-1
 Douglas DC-1 - Douglas DC-3/Dakota History
 Photo: The DC-1 before sale to Howard Hughes
 Photo: Lord Forbes inspecting the DC-1 in London Docks on arrival in 1938  
 Photo: The DC-1 in Spain

DC-01
1930s United States airliners
Low-wing aircraft
Aircraft first flown in 1933
Twin piston-engined tractor aircraft